Cāng zhú (苍术 or 蒼术 or 蒼朮), also known as black atractylodes rhizome or Rhizoma Atractylodes, is a Chinese herbal medicine.  It is the dried rhizome of Atractylodes lancea (Thunb.) DC., synonyms Atractylodes chinensis (DC.) Koidz, and Atractylodes japonica Koidz.  (One study suggested that A. chinensis is a subspecies of A. lancea, and A. chinensis var. liaotungensis is a subspecies of A. coreana)  The medicine is distinguished from bái zhú (白术 or 白朮, white atractylodes rhizome from Atractylodes macrocephala), which is typically cultivated, whereas cāng zhú more often tends to be collected from the wild.  It is believed that the distinction between cāng zhú and bái zhú emerged in relatively modern times; a single drug "zhú" described in the Shen nong ben cao jing probably included many Atractylodes species.

Production

Cultivation
 A. lancea is grown mainly in Hubei and Jiangsu.
 A. chinensis and A. japonica are grown in Jilin, Liaoning, Shandong, Inner Mongolia, and Korea.

Harvesting
The rhizome is dug up in the spring.  After cleaning, it can be sliced and stir baked to a yellow brown color.

Traditional attributes
In traditional Chinese medicine the herb is described as spicy or pungent, bitter, warm, and aromatic, acting on the spleen and stomach meridians.

A number of effects of the herb are described as ways of "drying dampness":
As a stomachic - for "Damp obstruction or accumulation in the Middle Jiao", with symptoms such as low appetite, abdominal distension, epigastric distress and fullness, indigestion, dyspepsia, diarrhea, nausea and vomiting, weariness, a heavy sensation in the body, and a thick greasy tongue coating.
To eliminate exopathogens - to "dispel wind-damp-cold (bi-syndrome)", explained as "headaches and body aches, fever, chills, blocked nasal passages, and an absence of sweating"
To treat "damp heat conditions" in the lower Jiao, including "Damp Leg Qi, aching and swollen joints, and vaginal discharge" (leukorrhea).  This includes relieving arthralgia, swollen knees, and foot pain.  Treatment of these conditions can involve combinations such as San Miao San or Er Maio San.
To induce sweating.

It is also used:
To treat night blindness or optic atrophy, either alone or as a component of Shi Ju Ming.
To relieve stagnant liver qi, reducing stress and relieving depression, in mixtures such as Jue Ju Wan.

Contraindications 
"Yin deficiency, deficiency of essence, and external asthenia and sweating" (due to Wei Qi deficiency) are traditional contraindications.  It has been noted to interfere with drugs for diabetes.  It can cause allergic reactions in those who are allergic to ragweed, marigolds, daisies, or related herbs (Asteraceae).  It should not be used by pregnant women or women who are breastfeeding.

Biochemical analysis 
There has been relatively little scientific study of cāng zhú.  A small number of reports in the primary scientific literature support the possibility of several medical uses, but pending confirmation they must be evaluated cautiously.

Atractylodes rhizomes showed possible hepatoprotective activity in an in vitro assay of a hepatocyte cell line treated with carbon tetrachloride or galactosamine, with significant hepatoprotective activity from the isolated sesquiterpenoid components atractylon, β-eudesmol, and hinesol.  One review stated that the volatile oil contains the important chemical components, and that β-eudesmol and hinesol are its active ingredients.

Compounds isolated from a hexane extract of A. lancea included atractylochromene, a potent inhibitor of 5-lipoxygenase (IC50 3.3 μmol L−1) and cyclooxygenase (IC50 0.6 μmol L−1); 2-[(2E)-3,7-dimethyl-2,6-octadienyl]-6-methyl-2,5-cyclohexadiene-1,4-dione, a selective inhibitor of lipoxygenase (IC50 0.2 μmol L−1); atractylon and osthol, weak inhibitors of lipoxygenase, and atractylenolides I, II, and III.  Atractylenolide I from bai zhú was reported to help with cachexia (a side effect of stomach cancer) and alter cytokine levels in a small non-blinded study.  It was found to bind competitively with lipopolysaccharide for cell surface receptors with IC50 values of 5 to 7 μmol L−1 for inhibiting TNF-α, IL-1β, and nitric oxide production.

A few sources have reported antimicrobial activity for the herb when burned as an incense: one coil of antiseptic atractylodes incense per 45 cubic meters of space significantly reduced the transmission of viruses and microbes, with an effect similar to formalin or ultraviolet light exposure.  A study of the phototoxicity of Chinese herbal medicines found that in mice treated with UVA ultraviolet radiation, A. japonica increased sunburn edema and formation of sunburn cells, and decreased local immune responses by decreasing epidermal Langerhans cells and contact hypersensitivity; but it also exerted its phototoxic effects on Candida albicans, a potential therapeutic use.

A prenylated dihydrobenzofuran derivative isolated from A. lancea, trans-2-hydroxyisoxypropyl-3-hydroxy-7-isopentene-2,3-dihydrobenzofuran-5-carboxylic acid, was found to be cytotoxic to two cancer cell lines tested.

Other components of the rhizome include:

 taraxerol acetate and φ-taraxasteryl acetate
 β-sitosterol
 stigmasterol and stigmasterol 3-O-β-D-glucopyranoside
 β-eudesmol
 atractylenolides I-IV
 daucosterol
 several acylsucrose derivatives in which sucrose is modified by three to four 3-methylbutanoyl moieties.
 additional sesquiterpenes

References

External links
苍术 entry in Hudong (Chinese) autotranslation

Plants used in traditional Chinese medicine
Plant common names

es:Atractylodes lancea